Sharpthorne is a village in the Mid Sussex District of West Sussex, South-East England. It lies on the West Hoathly  to Forest Row road 3.8 miles (6.2 km) south of East Grinstead.

External links

Villages in West Sussex
Mid Sussex District